The 1943 Milan–San Remo was the 36th edition of the Milan–San Remo cycle race and was held on 19 March 1943. The race started in Milan and finished in San Remo. The race was won by Cino Cinelli of the  team.

General classification

References

Milan–San Remo
1943 in road cycling
1943 in Italian sport